Raju Dhingan is an Indian politician from the Aam Admi Party, represented Trilokpuri constituency in the Delhi State Legislature.

Political career
Dhingan was employed with Central Industrial Security Force before entering politics. He also provides free training to youth in body building. Originally elected to represent Trilokpuri in 2013, Dhingan was reelected in 2015.

On 10 January 2017, sanitation workers dumped garbage in front of Dhingan's home as part of a strike to protest against government negligence.

References

Living people
Aam Aadmi Party politicians from Delhi
Delhi MLAs 2013–2015
Delhi MLAs 2015–2020
Year of birth missing (living people)